Smelowskia americana is a species of Smelowskia known by the common names alpine smelowskia, Siberian smelowskia, and American false candytuft.

Description
This perennial rhizomatous herb typically forms a grayish-green mat with more or less hairy stems reaching a maximum height of 1.5 centimeters to around 20 centimeters. They are borne on petioles about as long as the leaf. Leaves on the flower stem are similar but smaller and borne alternately on short petioles. A solitary flower-head is borne on a slender upright or ascending stem.

Evolutionary history
The evolutionary history of the Smelowskia genus was examined in a study published in 2010 in the journal Taxon. Based on microsatellite and DNA sequences, the Smelowskia genus first appeared in Central Asia. From there it dispersed in two separate events to North America by means of the Beringian land bridge. Smelowskia americana, S. porsildii and S. media are the result of one of these dispersals. S. porsildii is found in Beringia and S. media in the western arctic of North America. S. americana is the most widely dispersed of the three species, i.e., on mid-latitude mountains of western North America.
These three regions were free of glacial ice during the Last Glacial Maximum approximately 25,000–21,000 years ago. Consequently, these species may be the result of allopatric speciation in ice age refugia.

References

External links

Flora of Western Canada
Flora of the Northwestern United States
Flora of Nevada
Flora of Utah
Brassicaceae
Flora without expected TNC conservation status